Phước Vĩnh Base Camp (also known as Phước Vĩnh Combat Base) is a former U.S. Army base north of Biên Hòa in southern Vietnam.

History
The base was established in mid-1965 and was located approximately 35 km north of Biên Hòa in Phước Thành Province.

The 1st Brigade, 1st Infantry Division comprising:
1st Battalion, 2nd Infantry Regiment
1st Battalion, 16th Infantry Regiment (December 1965-November 1966)
1st Battalion, 26th Infantry Regiment
1st Battalion, 28th Infantry Regiment
2nd Battalion, 28th Infantry Regiment (December 1965-November 1966)
was based at Phước Vĩnh from December 1965 until February 1968.

The 506th Infantry Regiment moved to the base in December 1967 as part of Operation Uniontown and remained there until October 1968.

In November 1968 the 1st Cavalry Division moved here from Camp Evans as part of Operation Liberty Canyon and would remain based here until April 1971.

Other units stationed at Phước Vĩnh included:
5th Special Forces Group Detachment A-412
11th Aviation Company (July 1965-April 1971)
6th Battalion, 27th Artillery (November 1965-June 1966, January 1968)
31st Engineer Battalion (July 1968-mid 1971)
 1st Squadron, 9th Cavalry
 Headquarters Troop
 Charlie Troop
 Red Platoon (Gun) (AH-1G Cobra/OH-6A Cayuse)
 Blue Platoon (Lift) (UH-1H Iroquois)

Current use
The base appears to remain in use by the People's Army of Vietnam.

Accidents and incidents
 12 November 1968, two UH-1H helicopters from the 227th Assault Helicopter Company collided over the airfield causing one (#66-16983) to crash killing all four passengers and crew

References

External links
Modern photos and video of the site

Installations of the United States Army in South Vietnam
Buildings and structures in Bình Dương province